refers to a region in shinto that is a Shintai itself, or hosts a kami. They are generally either mountains or forests.

They may be host to Shinboku (sacred trees), or Iwakura rocks

Although natural locations, Kannabi will still have Shimenawa, Torii, and Sandō marking the path towards them.

Nachi Falls is considered a Kannabi, as is Mount Miwa.

Shrines dedicated to Kannabi often lack worship halls or hondens and instead enshrine the natural kannabis as deities. Ōmiwa Shrine is one such example.

See Also 
 Age of the Gods
 Ko-Shintō
 Himorogi・Iwakura (Yorishiro)
 Shintai・Yorishiro
 Shinboku
 Sacred mountains・Mountain worship
 Kannagi (Shinto)
 Chinju no Mori

References 

Forests of Japan
Animism
Shinto shrines
Pages with unreviewed translations
Mountain faith